Saint-Étienne-du-Bois may refer to two places in France:

Saint-Étienne-du-Bois, Ain
Saint-Étienne-du-Bois, Vendée